Yahya Kharmi (born 8 June 1998) is a Saudi Arabian footballer who plays for Wej as a winger.

References

External links
 

Living people
1998 births
Saudi Arabian footballers
Ittihad FC players
Al-Taawoun FC players
Al-Kholood Club players
Bisha FC players
Wej SC players
Saudi Professional League players
Saudi Second Division players
Saudi First Division League players
Association football wingers